Matt Garrison (born July 5, 1973) is an American basketball coach, formally head coach of the Niigata Albirex BB in the Japanese Bj League.

Head coaching record

|-
| style="text-align:left;"|Niigata Albirex BB
| style="text-align:left;"|2011–12
| 52||28||24|||| style="text-align:center;"|4th in Eastern|||5||3||2||
| style="text-align:center;"|Lost in 2nd round
|-
| style="text-align:left;"|Niigata Albirex BB
| style="text-align:left;"|2012–13
| 52||36||16|||| style="text-align:center;"|1st in Eastern|||4||2||2||
| style="text-align:center;"|4th
|-

References

1973 births
Living people
Adelaide 36ers players
American expatriate basketball people in Australia
American expatriate basketball people in Japan
American men's basketball players
Biola Eagles men's basketball players
Cairns Taipans players
Kagawa Five Arrows players
Montana State Bobcats men's basketball players
Niigata Albirex BB coaches
Niigata Albirex BB players
San Diego Stingrays players
Wollongong Hawks players
Al Riyadi Club Beirut basketball players